Michel George Haddad (22 February 1902 – 3 May 1983) was an Egyptian boxer who competed in the 1924 Summer Olympics. In 1924 he was eliminated in the first round of the lightweight class after losing his fight to Luigi Marfut.

References

External links
Michel Haddad's profile at Sports Reference.com

1902 births
1983 deaths
Lightweight boxers
Olympic boxers of Egypt
Boxers at the 1924 Summer Olympics
Egyptian male boxers
20th-century Egyptian people